Meggen is a municipality in the district of Lucerne in the canton of Lucerne in Switzerland.

History
Meggen is first mentioned in 1226 as Meken, though a 14th Century copy of an older document mentions in Acta Murensia around 1160.

Geography

Of this area, 47.6% is used for agricultural purposes, while 23.7% is forested. Of the rest of the land, 28.5% is settled (buildings or roads) and the remainder (0.3%) is non-productive (rivers, glaciers or mountains). , 23.69% of the total land area was forested. Of the agricultural land, 41.6% is used for farming or pastures, while 6.06% is used for orchards or vine crops. Of the settled areas, 20.25% is covered with buildings, 0.41% is industrial, 0.69% is classed as special developments, 1.79% is parks or greenbelts and 5.37% is transportation infrastructure. Of the unproductive areas,   and 0.14% is other unproductive land.

The municipality is located on the Küssnacht arm of the Lake of Lucerne.  In 1897 it was the end station of the Gotthardbahn.

Demographics
, 10.6% of the population was made up of foreign nationals. Over the last 10 years the population has grown at a rate of 10.4%. Most of the population speaks German  (93.3%), with English being second most common ( 1.6%) and Italian being third ( 1.0%).

In the 2007 election the most popular party was the FDP which received 33.1% of the vote.  The next three most popular parties were the SVP (24.8%), the CVP (21.8%) and the SPS (10.3%).

The age distribution in Meggen is; 1,300 people or 20.1% of the population is 0–19 years old.  1,304 people or 20.1% are 20–39 years old, and 2,561 people or 39.6% are 40–64 years old.  The senior population distribution is 935 people or 14.4% are 65–79 years old, 312 or 4.8% are 80–89 years old and 61 people or 0.9% of the population are 90+ years old.

In Meggen about 86.3% of the population (between age 25-64) have completed either non-mandatory upper secondary education or additional higher education (either university or a Fachhochschule).

 there are 2,479 households, of which 752 households (or about 30.3%) contain only a single individual.  136 or about 5.5% are large households, with at least five members.   there were 1,149 inhabited buildings in the municipality, of which 974 were built only as housing, and 175 were mixed use buildings.  There were 643 single family homes, 118 double family homes, and 213 multi-family homes in the municipality.  Most homes were either two (473) or three (337) story structures.  There were only 67 single story buildings and 97 four or more story buildings.

Meggen has an unemployment rate of 1.4%.  , there were 153 people employed in the primary economic sector and about 37 businesses involved in this sector.  199 people are employed in the secondary sector and there are 40 businesses in this sector.  1219 people are employed in the tertiary sector, with 238 businesses in this sector.   50.9% of the population of the municipality were employed in some capacity.  At the same time, females made up 43.6% of the workforce.

 the religious membership of Meggen was; 3,841 (64.8%) were Roman Catholic, and 1,203 (20.3%) were Protestant, with an additional 51 (0.86%) that were of some other Christian faith.  There are 3 individuals (0.05% of the population) who are Jewish.  There are 32 individuals (0.54% of the population) who are Muslim.  Of the rest; there were 29 (0.49%) individuals who belong to another religion, 598 (10.1%) who do not belong to any organized religion, 166 (2.8%) who did not answer the question.

The historical population is given in the following table:

Transportation
Both are located on the Lucerne–Immensee line.

Notable residents and local celebrities
 Dimitri Ashkenazy, clarinetist
 Vladimir Ashkenazy, conductor
 Rolf Brem, sculptor, illustrator and graphic artist
  Cesaro, professional wrestler
 James Galway, British flutist
 Ariella Kaeslin, Swiss artistic gymnast
 Marc Rich, commodities trader
 Thomas Rüfenacht, Swiss ice hockey player
 Maria Katherina Scherer, beatified nun

References

External links
 Photos of Meggen at Flickr

Municipalities of the canton of Lucerne
Populated places on Lake Lucerne